The 2022–23 UEFA Youth League is the ninth season of the UEFA Youth League, a European youth club football competition organised by UEFA.

The title holders are Benfica, who defeated Salzburg 6–0 in the previous season's final. They are unable to defend the title as they were eliminated in the group stage.

Teams 
A total of 64 teams from 39 of the 55 UEFA member associations entered the tournament. They were split into two sections, each with 32 teams.

 UEFA Champions League Path: The youth teams of the 32 clubs which qualified for the 2022–23 UEFA Champions League group stage entered the UEFA Champions League Path. If there was a vacancy (youth teams not entering), it was filled by a team defined by UEFA.
 Domestic Champions Path: The youth domestic champions of the top 32 associations according to their 2022 UEFA country coefficients entered the Domestic Champions Path. If there was a vacancy (associations with no youth domestic competition, as well as youth domestic champions already included in the UEFA Champions League path), it was first filled by the title holders should they have not yet qualified, and then by the youth domestic champions of the next association in the UEFA ranking.

Apolonia, Ashdod, Borac Banja Luka, Coleraine, Eintracht Frankfurt, Hibernian, Jelgava, Nantes, Omonia, Pobeda, Pyunik, Racing Union, Rukh Lviv, Shamrock Rovers, Trenčín and Zagłębie Lubin make their tournament debuts. Armenia and Northern Ireland are represented for the first time.

Notes

Round and draw dates 
The schedule of the competition is as follows (all draws were held at the UEFA headquarters in Nyon, Switzerland, unless stated otherwise).

 For the UEFA Champions League Path group stage, in principle the teams play their matches on Tuesdays and Wednesdays of the matchdays as scheduled for UEFA Champions League, and on the same day as the corresponding senior teams; however, matches could also be played on other dates, including Mondays and Thursdays.
 For the Domestic Champions Path first and second rounds, in principle matches are played on Wednesdays (first round on matchdays 2 and 3, second round on matchdays 4 and 5, as scheduled for UEFA Champions League); however, matches could also be played on other dates, including Mondays, Tuesdays and Thursdays.

UEFA Champions League Path

For the UEFA Champions League Path, the 32 teams were drawn into eight groups of four. There was no separate draw held, with the group compositions identical to the draw for the 2022–23 UEFA Champions League group stage, which was held on 25 August 2022, 18:00 CEST (19:00 TRT), in Istanbul, Turkey.

In each group, teams played against each other home-and-away in a round-robin format. The group winners advanced to the round of 16, while the eight runners-up advanced to the play-offs, where they would be joined by the eight second round winners from the Domestic Champions Path.

Group A

Group B

Group C

Group D

Group E

Group F

Group G

Group H

Domestic Champions Path

For the Domestic Champions Path, the 32 teams were drawn into two rounds of two-legged home-and-away ties. The draw for both the first round and second round was held on 31 August 2022.

The eight second round winners advance to the play-offs, where they will join by the eight group runners-up from the UEFA Champions League Path (group stage).

First round

Second round

Knockout phase

Bracket

Play-offs

Round of 16

Quarter-finals

Semi-finals

Final

Top goalscorers

References

External links

 
Youth
2022-23
2023 in youth association football
2022 in youth association football